The 1962 European Cup final was a football match held at the Olympisch Stadion, Amsterdam, on 2 May 1962, that saw Benfica play against Real Madrid. Benfica defeated their opponents 5–3, to win the European Cup for the second successive season.

Ferenc Puskás became the first player to score a hat-trick in multiple European Cup finals, having also becoming the only one to ever score four goals in a European Cup final in 1960, and the first to score a hat-trick in the European Cup final but ended up on the losing side.

Route to the final

Match

Details

See also
Real Madrid CF in international football
S.L. Benfica in international football

Notes

References

External links

1961–62 season at the UEFA website
European Cup History 1962
Video highlights from official Pathé News archive

1
European Cup Final 1962
European Cup Final 1962
1962
European Cup Final 1962
European Cup Final
European Cup Final
European Cup Final
May 1962 sports events in Europe
1960s in Amsterdam
European Cup Final, 1962